Egor Dmitrievich Murashov (born 20 May 2000) is a Russian-born figure skater who competes for Switzerland. For Russia, he is the 2018 Christmas Cup champion, the 2019 Sofia Trophy champion, and the 2019 Cup of Tyrol bronze medalist. On the junior level, he is the 2017 JGP Austria bronze medalist.

In May 2021, Murashov announced that he would begin representing Switzerland from the 2021–22 season. He is the 2022 Swiss national silver medalist.

Programs

Competitive highlights 
CS: Challenger Series; JGP: Junior Grand Prix

 For Switzerland

 For Russia

References

External links 
 

2000 births
Living people
Russian male single skaters
Swiss male single skaters
Figure skaters from Moscow